Warren Roper may refer to:

 Warren Roper (chemist) (born 1938), New Zealand chemist
 Warren Roper (footballer) (born 1940), Australian rules footballer